The People's Action Movement (PAM) is a political party in Saint Kitts and Nevis. The party currently holds four (largest share) of the 11 seats in the National Assembly. PAM operates only in Saint Kitts and for the 2022 general election is in a 'One Movement' alliance with the Concerned Citizens' Movement (CCM) operating in Nevis, following the breakdown of the governing Team Unity alliance. PAM is a member of the Caribbean Democrat Union, the regional affiliate of the International Democrat Union and shares close links with other centre-right party members in the Caribbean such as the Jamaica Labour Party.

History 
The party first contested national elections in 1966, when they received 35.0% of the vote and won two seats. They were reduced to a single seat in the 1971 elections, but regained their second seat in 1975. In the 1980 elections they won three seats, and were able to form a coalition government with the Nevis Reformation Party to oust the Saint Kitts and Nevis Labour Party (SKNLP) from power for the first time since 1952. PAM leader Kennedy Simmonds led the country to independence in 1983, and the party won six of the eleven seats in the 1984 elections to remain in power. They again won six seats in 1989. The 1993 elections saw the both parties winning four seats.

Constance V. Mitcham, the first women to sit in the national assembly, was elected as a PAM candidate in 1984 and served until 1995.

The PAM remained in power, but early elections were held in 1995, which saw the PAM reduced to just one seat (with Simmonds losing his). They lost their single seat in the 2000 elections, but regained it in 2004, with Shawn Richards winning constituency no. 5. In the 2010 elections they won two seats.

Lindsay Grant served as Leader of the PAM until his resignation in July 2012. After Grant's resignation, Shawn K. Richards and Eugene A. Hamilton contested for the party leadership in 2012; Richards came out the victor and became 4th Leader of the PAM and Hamilton became Deputy Leader.

Team Unity 
Prior to the 2015 general elections, the People's Action Movement formed a political alliance, known as Team Unity, with the Concerned Citizens' Movement (CCM) from sister island Nevis and the newly formed People's Labour Party, which was led by former SKNLP members Timothy Harris and Sam Condor.

Election results

References

External links 
Official website

Political parties in Saint Kitts and Nevis
International Democrat Union member parties
1965 establishments in Saint Kitts and Nevis
Political parties established in 1965
Conservative parties
Republican parties
Republicanism in Saint Kitts and Nevis